The Vessel is a 2016 film starring Martin Sheen.  Cuban American filmmaker Julio Quintana wrote and directed and his brother Lucas Quintana stars alongside Sheen. Terrence Malick was an executive producer on the film. The movie was filmed in English and Spanish, with each speaking scene shot in both languages, using a Puerto Rican bilingual cast. The film was shot primarily in La Perla, San Juan, Puerto Rico.

Synopsis

Ten years after a tsunami destroyed a small-town elementary school with all the children inside, a young man who was dead in a drowning (not in the tsunami, but a separate event) for three hours and then came back to life builds a mysterious structure out of the school's remains, setting the town aflame with passions long forgotten.

Cast
 Martin Sheen as Father Douglas
 Luis Quintana as Leo
 Jacqueline Duprey as Fidelia
 Aris Mejias as Soraya
 Eugenio Monclova as the deacon

Release

The film was released in the U.S. on September 16, 2016. It was later released on Blu-ray and a 2-disc DVD on January 24, 2017; both releases containing both the English and Spanish versions of the film.

Reception

The review aggregator website Rotten Tomatoes reported a 67% approval rating, with an average rating of 5.95/10 based on 18 reviews.
Film critic Frank Scheck called the movie "gorgeous, dreamlike style and Infused with heavy doses of mysticism and allegory."

References

External links
 

2016 films
Puerto Rican films